Tiaong, officially the Municipality of Tiaong,  is a 1st class municipality in the province of Quezon, Philippines. According to the 2020 census, it has a population of 106,265 people.

History
In 1957, the following barrios were created:
 Matipunso, from barrio Niing
 Behia, from barrio Callejon
 Bucal, from barrio Buha.

Geography

Barangays
Tiaong is politically subdivided into 31 barangays.

 Anastacia
 Aquino
 Ayusan I
 Ayusan II
 Behia
 Bukal
 Bula
 Bulakin
 Cabatang
 Cabay
 Del Rosario
 Lagalag
 Lalig
 Lumingon
 Lusacan
 Paiisa
 Palagaran
 Poblacion I
 Poblacion II
 Poblacion III
 Poblacion IV
 Quipot
 San Agustin
 San Isidro
 San Jose
 San Juan
 San Pedro
 Tagbakin
 Talisay
 Tamisian
 San Francisco

Climate

Demographics

Economy

Government

Elected officials
Municipal council (2019-2022):
Mayor: Ramon Preza
Vice Mayor: William Razon
Councilors:
 Maria Maja Escueta Landicho	
 Tomas Ilao 	
 John Paul Preza
 Jessa Preza	
 Gemson Boongaling	
 Eugene Lopez	
 Roderick Convento
 Elton Rex Baldeo

Tourism
 Moises Amat Escueta Ala-ala Park
 Saint John the Baptist Parish Church of Tiaong
 Escudero, Villa escudero

Education

Elementary schools
Private school
Southside Integrated Scool
Kiddie Corner School Inc.
Saint John Parochial School
 Gaudete Study Center Inc
 Tiaong Christian Academy
 Maranatha Christian Academy
Public School
Anastacia Elementary School
Lusacan Elementary School
Del Rosario Elementary School
Lagalag Elementary School
Hilirang Buli Elementary School
Tiaong East Elementary School
Claro M. Recto Memorial Central School

High schools
 Private School
 St. John Parochial School
 Don Ysidro Memorial School
 Gaudete Study Center Inc.
 Public High School
 Recto Memorial National High School
 Lalig National High School
Lusacan National High School
Cabay National High School
Gloria Umali National High School
Paiisa National High School
Talisay National High School

Colleges and universities
Public Schools
 College
 Southern Luzon State University
Private Schools:
Asian Institute of Technology and Education
Olinsterg College

Gallery

References

External links

Tiaong Profile at PhilAtlas.com
[ Philippine Standard Geographic Code]
Philippine Census Information
Local Governance Performance Management System

Municipalities of Quezon